The development of Mother 3, a role-playing video game from Nintendo, spanned a total of twelve years between 1994 and 2006 with a three year gap in between, and spanned four consoles and multiple delays. Following the commercial success of its predecessor, Mother 2 (EarthBound outside Japan), Mother series creator Shigesato Itoi was given the previous game's development team.

Inspired by Super Mario 64, the team set out to create a 3D game that ultimately exceeded the capabilities of the platform. Along the way, the team changed its console focus from the Super Famicom to the Nintendo 64 and its 64DD peripheral, for which the game was expected to be a 1998 launch game. Upon the commercial failure of the 64DD, the game was converted to cartridge plus expansion disk. Itoi developed the game's concept during Mother 2s development and built a 12-chapter story with player-characters that rotated between chapters. Having been a producer during Mother 2, Itoi served as a scriptwriter during Mother 3s development.

A North American version was announced as EarthBound 64, but did not materialize when the 60 percent-complete Japanese release was canceled in August 2000 in reprioritization leading up to Project Dolphin (the code name of the GameCube). At the time, the game was estimated to need another two years of work.

After multiple years and failed petitions, Mother 3 was reannounced for the Game Boy Advance in 2003 within a Japanese television commercial for Mother 1+2, a port of Mother and Mother 2 to the Advance. The game kept its original story and received a graphical overhaul in a pixelated style similar to Mother 2. The game's themes included human psychology, renewal, and fungibility on the morality spectrum. Its music was composed by Shogo Sakai, and retained the quirky style of series composers Keiichi Suzuki and Hirokazu Tanaka. Mother 3 was released on April 20, 2006 in Japan, whereupon it became a bestseller. It has not been released outside Japan.

Nintendo 64

Mother 3 was originally developed for the Super Famicom (Super Nintendo Entertainment System) beginning in 1994. Shigeru Miyamoto, head of Nintendo Entertainment Analysis & Development and Mother 3 producer, said that Mother 3 was "a commercial decision", since Mother 2 (EarthBound outside Japan) had sold well. By this point, Mother series creator Shigesato Itoi had worked on the series' earlier games and Itoi Shigesato no Bass Tsuri No. 1 and was experienced at pitching video games, so Miyamoto provided a team willingly. The Mother 2 development team carried over to the new game's development, though several people left and the team grew in size. They forwent the usual prototyping phase and went straight into development expecting to create something unprecedented. Itoi said he wanted to make the game like a Hollywood film. In September 1994, he predicted that Mother 3s development would end around 1996 with a release on Nintendo's then-upcoming console. The team was inspired by Super Mario 64 and decided that they too could creatively flourish by making a 3D open world. Their early technical specifications exceeded the capabilities and memory limits of the platform. About halfway through development, the team attempted to scale back its large scope and changed its target from cartridge to the 64DD peripheral. At E3 in June 1997, Miyamoto speculated that Mother 3 would be one of the four games for the then-expected 1998 launch of the Japan-only peripheral.

The EarthBound fan community anticipated a sequel, and a North American release of Mother 3 was announced as EarthBound 64. Nintendo displayed a playable version of the game at its Space World 1999 trade show, where IGN described the development's progress as "very far along" and half complete. Having followed a period of media silence, the announcement there of its conversion from 64DD disk to  cartridge plus mission expansion disk was taken by IGN as a sign of further delay or cancellation of the 64DD altogether. In April 2000, IGN estimated the game's development as "safe to assume that the game is nearing its final stages of completion". The company struggled to find a firm release date, and was expected to release in Japan before a North American version would be considered. At the time, the 64DD was only released in Japan. Nintendo did not show the game at the 2000 Electronic Entertainment Expo, though IGN expected to see a finished version of the game at Space World 2000. Mother producer Satoru Iwata canceled the game altogether prior to Space World 2000, as announced by Itoi on August 20.

Iwata clarified that the franchise was not abandoned but that the game would no longer be developed for the Nintendo 64, and Miyamoto added that it was not due to project complications or development hell, but to resources needed for Project Dolphin (the GameCube). Some of the artists had been on the project for over three years. They estimated the project to be about 60 percent complete at the time of cancellation—the basics were complete and only programming was left. About 30 percent of the final product was completed. Itoi estimated that it would have taken an additional two years to finish properly, and Iwata said that the game might have been finished by 2000 had the scope been reduced two years earlier. Miyamoto was involved in other work and spent little time on-site with the project, and Iwata too was distracted by bankruptcy concerns at HAL Labs and was off-site in 1999 due to circumstances that required travel. Iwata was also hospitalized during production for stress-related reasons. The team intended to have the game finished by the end of 1999 and knew they had to reconsider their priorities when they missed the milestone. They said that the Mother 3 supervisors had wanted to cancel the project since 1999, but later changed sides and said that cancellation would be wasteful. They discussed bringing the game to their forthcoming GameCube, which Miyamoto said would have solved some of the Nintendo 64's hardware issues. Miyamoto and Iwata also discussed releasing the game on the Game Boy Advance, but realized that it would take "just as much time" with 40 to 50 staff members to make such a game. In retrospect, Iwata wondered out loud in an interview why the game needed to be in 3D when Itoi's "greatest talent lies in words" and thought that the energy poured into making a 3D game might have been a poor choice. He said he was "genuinely ashamed", and acknowledged that they were both "caught up in the 3D obsession and felt obligated" at the time. At the time of its cancellation, Itoi predicted that Mother 3 would remain a story that only the game's staff would know, though he also expressed an interest in making the story into a novel or kamishibai if he had the time. Miyamoto was still interested in bringing the game to fruition.

Design

Itoi conceived the premise of Mother 3 towards the end of Mother 2s production. He called another person on the project to describe a "detective story where the city was the main character". He envisioned a hack, small-time, womanizing private investigator who would become engrossed in a big murder case, and the story would unfold from a young female clerk at a flower shop who would slowly recall parts of a story consequential to the plot. Thus, the city would appear to grow. This idea of a "single place changing over time" was central to Mother 3. He saw previous RPGs as "road movies" with little reason for the hero to backtrack to previous areas, and instead wanted the player to see the town gossip grow dynamically. Miyamoto and Itoi compared this type of progression to the story of Legend of Zelda: Majora's Mask. The game was enough of a departure from the series that the development team questioned whether fans would consider it part of the series.

Itoi originally intended the game to have 12 chapters with varied game mechanics; for example, one with classic role-playing game mechanics and another as just cutscenes. He conceptualized the process as designing 3D "puppets" that could then be easily moved around the "stage". In actuality, each custom scene required special programming. The player-character changed between each chapter—a concept they first attempted in their previous game—so as to see multiple characters grow. As development wore on, Itoi offered to compromise by replacing full chapters with sequences of still images and text. They cut the total chapters to seven or nine by the time it was canceled. Itoi described the story as "normal" for its first half, leading up to a "triple-play twist". One of the game's themes was the reckless appearance and "uncomfortable beauty" of chimera—multiple creatures fused into one—which was the idea behind the metallic and wooden Mother 3 logo. Itoi has said of his role in the Mother series that he wanted to be more of a team member and scriptwriter and less of a manager in Mother 3s development. He saw himself as simultaneously making the game he wanted to play and setting traps for the player, and as making a game Nintendo could not.

The Mother 3 logo was made from a fusion of metal and trees, which Itoi interpreted as an "uncomfortable beauty" from two materials that were impossible to fuse. This is also a theme in his only novel. The chimeras theme informed the game's original subtitle: "Forest of the Chimeras". Itoi compared the reckless appearance of chimeras to the mutilated toys of Sid from Toy Story. The subtitle eventually became "The End of the Pig King" before the game was canceled and the final release has no subtitle because Itoi did not want to lead the player's interpretation.

The game was set to continue 10 years after the first Mother. The player-character, Flint, was a cowboy in the vein of Clint Eastwood with two boys, Lucca and Klaus (later becoming Lucas and Claus), and a dog, Boney. The game was to include over 10 playable characters and span 10 years in its story based around the Pig army, which attempts to use "primitive machinery ... to enslave mankind". At Space World 1999, IGN sampled environments including a hovercraft in a desert canyon, a snake dungeon, a cutscene with a bullet train, a town with non-player characters, and a mine cart scene, through themes including fantasy, the medieval, and science fiction. Physical contact with an enemy in the overworld triggered a turn-based battle scene shown in the first-person (similar to EarthBound). The battles had psychedelic backgrounds and a circular menu that included a command to "get up" if the player was knocked down in a real-time sequence. Attacks could be timed with the in-game music for stronger effects. The developers also planned multiple routes for advancing through the game and unforeseen complications from minor actions, such as a monster finding food dropped in the forest. The game was set to include features such as synching the game's time with the real time, but those features required the 64DD. Mother 3 was set to run between 40 and 60 hours in length.

Reception

In its review of the Space World 1999 demo, IGN found the mine cart scene—where Lucca and Klaus outrun a collapsing cave in a minecart—to be its "most impressive" sequence. They added that it "might be one of the most impressive cutscenes on the N64 yet". IGN said that the controls were intuitive, the sound "well orchestrated and memorable", the 3D game engine "strong", and the battle system "confusing". They wrote that the game would be highly original, but were not able to tell the degree to which the story or characters would interact. IGN compared the multi-character aspect of the narrative to the Japan-only Super Famicom RPG Live A Live. Famitsu readers ranked the game as one of their top ten most anticipated towards the end of 1999.

Game Boy Advance

Three years later, a Japanese Mother 1+2 television advertisement included a slide announcing a future release of Mother 3. While working on the compilation that would port Mother and Mother 2 to the Game Boy Advance, Itoi predicted further pressure to release Mother 3 and decided, based on encouragement from several failed fan petitions, to release the game. Itoi had earlier assumed that restarting the project was impossible, and said that his final effort to finish the game to be more like a "prayer" than like "vengeance". Other than the graphical changes required for a release on the Advance, the game was to keep its original story. Brownie Brown staff assisted in the game's development, and Itoi worked with them on individual pacing issues.

Itoi chose to use the pixelated style of Mother 2 for Mother 3 because he was uninterested in computer graphics trends. He said that it was only coincidentally related to the resurgence of interest in retrogaming. The series' games were written in the hiragana alphabet instead of in kanji (Chinese characters) so as to remain accessible to young children. Itoi described the world as governed by "might equals right" and its power struggle as "macho". The antagonist, Porky, was designed as a "symbol of humankind". Itoi associated the game's view of evil to the "fun and games" on the spectrum of "pranks" to "crimes", and likened its tone to the lyrics of the song "Reunion" by Kazuko Matsuo, where the subject falls in love with someone the world finds evil. Itoi compared how the characters come to realize their psychic powers with menstruation, and added that human physiology was "one of his themes". As such, players sweat when learning an ability, based on Itoi's belief of how physical struggle facilitates growth. He also included characters like the Magypsies and Duster (who has a bad leg) to show the value of having friends with different qualities. Some environments were added to serve specific purposes. For example, Osohe Castle was meant to show the scale of time and Tantane Island was designed to reflect the player's worst nightmares as similar to Mother 2s "hallucinatory city", Moonside. Another of his themes is the duality of the seriousness and lightheartedness of games, which is why he added a serious death scene to the first chapter. Parts of the game reference outside media such as Kiki's Delivery Service, a film by Studio Ghibli, a company for which Itoi had written film taglines and had voiced the father in My Neighbor Totoro.

Itoi wrote the game's ending while overseas in Saipan before Mother 3 was canceled. His Nintendo 64 version was darker, "dirtier", and more upsetting, though the final version changed little in concept. The Nintendo 64 version was to be more vague and left to the player's imagination through its sparse dialogue. Itoi attributed the change in tone to his own growth and the character composition of the new development team. He said that he had not been changed by fans. Itoi always planned for the two brothers to fight each other, though he did not write the ending until after production had already begun, a process he compared with Hayao Miyazaki's. Itoi processed each line individually as he wrote the final scene, and later reflected on its moral content that bad people sometimes need even more help than the good people. He said that the one line that makes him most emotional is, "You must be tired". Itoi said that the ending's renewal theme reflected his worldview of appreciating our time on Earth in light of the planet's inevitable end. Much of the rest of the script was written after-hours at a local hotel where they would continue their work.

By July 2004, the game was about 60 percent finished and was set for a late 2005 release in Japan. The game was released on April 20, 2006 in Japan for the Game Boy Advance, whereupon it became a bestseller. A limited edition Deluxe Box Set was produced with a special edition Game Boy Micro and Franklin Badge pin. It did not receive a North American release on the basis that it would not sell well. Digital Trends wrote that the game's emphasis on "magical transgender gurus" might have also affected the decision.

Music

All of the game's music was composed by Shogo Sakai. Itoi saw Sakai as competing with Mother 2 composer Keiichi Suzuki for his fans. Itoi had to choose a composer from the development team who understood the series and could work full-time on the project, including other development duties. Thus, he could not choose Suzuki, who was outside the project, or Hirokazu Tanaka, who had become the president of Creatures. Sakai also understood the game's story intimately and named the Magypsies after musical terms. He worked to make the music feel similar to previous entries in the series.

There are 250 tracks in the game's sound player. Itoi did not have a favorite of Sakai's work. He noted that the final track, "Love Theme", was added towards the end of the development cycle. While the ending was incomplete, Itoi planned to use the Pigmask theme, but they decided to add a new song to better reflect their intentions in December 2005. The game's soundtrack was released on compact disc on November 2, 2006. Kyle Miller of RPGFan wrote that the game retained the quirkiness of the previous soundtracks in the series though switching composers. He found the second half of the album, which included reinterpreted "classics" from the series, to be its strongest.

References

Mother (video game series)
Mother 3